The Chief of the Defence Staff (CDS) is the professional head of the Ghana Armed Forces. He is thus responsible for the administration and the operational control and command of the Ghana military.  The CDS is a member of the Armed Forces Council. This council advice the President of Ghana on matters of policy relating to defence and also regulates the administration of the Armed Forces. It also advises the President on the promotion of all officers above the rank of Lieutenant-Colonel or its equivalent.

The CDS is appointed by the President, in consultation with the Council of State of Ghana.

The current CDS is Vice Admiral Seth Amoama. He was appointed by President Akuffo-Addo in January 2021.

History of the post
The Ghana Army was formed after World War II out of the Gold Coast Regiment of the Royal West African Frontier Force. The officer corps then was entirely European. It was modeled on the British Army. At independence in 1957, the highest ranking Ghanaian officer was a major. Major General A. G. V. Paley served as the General Officer Commanding the Ghana Regiment of Infantry which had succeeded the Gold Coast Regiment between 1957 and 1959. This position was effectively equivalent to Army commander as there was no Air Force or Navy.

The position of Chief of Defence Staff was first created in 1959 after the formation of the Ghana Navy and the Ghana Air Force. Major-General Henry Alexander was appointed as the first CDS though he effectively doubled as the Ghana Army commander as well. Since 1961, the position of army commander and CDS have been separate. The first native Ghanaian CDS was Major General S. J. A. Otu.

Chiefs of the Defence Staff (1954–present)
The former heads of the Ghana Armed Forces were referred to while in office as either General Officers Commanding or Chiefs of the Defence Staff.

See also
 Ghana Army
 Ghana Air Force
 Ghana Navy

References

External links
 1992 Constitution Chapter 17:The Armed Forces of Ghana
 Ghana Armed Forces website

Military of Ghana
 
Ghana
Ghanaian Heads of Security Services